The following is a list of concert performances by the Ramones, complete through 1996. They performed 2,263 concerts over the course of 22 years.

1974

1975

1976

* - Show included a matinée

Typical setlist 

 "Loudmouth"
 "Beat on the Brat"
 "Blitzkrieg Bop"
 "I Remember You"
 "Glad to See You Go"
 "Chain Saw" or "Gimme Gimme Shock Treatment"
 "53rd & 3rd"
 "I Wanna Be Your Boyfriend"
 "Havana Affair"
 "Listen to My Heart"
 "California Sun" (Joe Jones cover)
 "Judy Is a Punk"
 "I Don't Wanna Walk Around with You"
 "Today Your Love, Tomorrow the World"

Encore:
 "Now I Wanna Sniff Some Glue"
 "Let's Dance" (Chris Montez cover)

1977

* - These shows included a matinée

First setlist (Leg 2)
"Loudmouth"
"Beat on the Brat"
"Blitzkrieg Bop"
"I Remember You"
"Glad to See You Go"
"Gimme Gimme Shock Treatment"
"You're Gonna Kill That Girl"
"Carbona Not Glue"
"Oh Oh I Love Her So"
"Commando"
"I Wanna Be Your Boyfriend"
"Havana Affair"
"Listen to My Heart"
California Sun
"Judy Is a Punk"
"I Don't Wanna Walk Around With You"
"Pinhead"
Encore:
  "Now I Wanna Sniff Some Glue"
"Today Your Love, Tomorrow the World"
Encore 2:
 "Suzy Is a Headbanger"
"Chain Saw"
 "Let's Dance" (Chris Montez cover)
Encore 3:
 "53rd & 3rd"
"Now I Wanna Be a Good Boy"

Second setlist (Leg 5)
 "Rockaway Beach"
 "Teenage Lobotomy"
 "Blitzkrieg Bop"
 "I Wanna Be Well"
 "Glad to See You Go"
 "Gimme Gimme Shock Treatment"
 "You're Gonna Kill That Girl"
 "I Don't Care"
 "Sheena Is a Punk Rocker"
 "Havana Affair"
 "Commando"
 "Here Today, Gone Tomorrow"
 "Surfin' Bird" (The Trashmen cover)
 "Cretin Hop"
 "Listen to My Heart"
 "California Sun" (Joe Jones cover)
 "I Don't Wanna Walk Around with You"
 "Pinhead"

Encore:
 "Do You Want to Dance" (Bobby Freeman cover)
 "Chain Saw"
 "Today Your Love, Tomorrow the World"

Encore 2:
 "Now I Wanna Be a Good Boy"
 "Suzy Is a Headbanger"
 "Let's Dance" (Chris Montez cover)

Encore 3:
 "Oh Oh I Love Her So"
 "Now I Wanna Sniff Some Glue"
 "We're a Happy Family"

1978

First setlist (Legs 1-2)
 "Rockaway Beach"
 "Teenage Lobotomy"
 "Blitzkrieg Bop"
 "I Wanna Be Well"
 "Glad to See You Go"
 "Gimme Gimme Shock Treatment"
 "You're Gonna Kill That Girl"
 "I Don't Care"
 "Sheena Is a Punk Rocker"
 "Havana Affair"
 "Commando"
 "Here Today, Gone Tomorrow"
 "Surfin' Bird" (The Trashmen cover)
 "Cretin Hop"
 "Listen to My Heart"
 "California Sun" (Joe Jones cover)
 "I Don't Wanna Walk Around with You"
 "Pinhead"

Encore:
 "Do You Want to Dance" (Bobby Freeman cover)
 "Chain Saw"
 "Today Your Love, Tomorrow the World"

Encore 2:
 "Now I Wanna Be a Good Boy"
 "Suzy Is a Headbanger"
 "Let's Dance" (Chris Montez cover)

Encore 3:
 "Oh Oh I Love Her So"
 "Now I Wanna Sniff Some Glue"
 "We're a Happy Family"

Second setlist (Legs 3-4)
 "Rockaway Beach"
 "Teenage Lobotomy"
 "Blitzkrieg Bop"
 "I Don't Want You"
 "Go Mental"
 "Gimme Gimme Shock Treatment"
 "You're Gonna Kill That Girl"
 "Don't Come Close"
 "I Don't Care"
 "She's the One"
 "Sheena Is a Punk Rocker"
 "Havana Affair"
 "Commando"
 "Needles and Pins" (Jackie DeShannon cover)
 "Surfin' Bird" (The Trashmen cover)
 "Cretin Hop"
 "Listen to My Heart"
 "California Sun" (Joe Jones cover)
 "I Don't Wanna Walk Around with You"
 "Pinhead"

Encore:
 "Do You Want to Dance" (Bobby Freeman cover)
"Oh Oh I Love Her So"
 "Today Your Love, Tomorrow the World"

Encore 2:
 "Judy Is a Punk"
 "Now I Wanna Sniff Some Glue"
 "We're a Happy Family"

Third setlist (Legs 5-7) 

 "Rockaway Beach"
 "Teenage Lobotomy"
 "Blitzkrieg Bop"
 "I Don't Want You"
 "Go Mental"
 "Gimme Gimme Shock Treatment"
 "You're Gonna Kill That Girl"
 "Don't Come Close"
 "I Just Want to Have Something to Do"
 "Bad Brain"
 "She's the One"
 "Sheena Is a Punk Rocker"
 "Havana Affair"
 "Commando"
 "Needles and Pins" (Jackie DeShannon cover)
 "Surfin' Bird" (The Trashmen cover)
 "Cretin Hop"
 "Listen to My Heart"
 "California Sun" (Joe Jones cover)
 "I Don't Wanna Walk Around with You"
 "Pinhead"

Encore:

"Do You Want to Dance" (Bobby Freeman cover)
 "I Wanna Be Sedated"
 "Today Your Love, Tomorrow the World"

Encore 2:

"Judy Is a Punk"
 "Now I Wanna Sniff Some Glue"
 "We're a Happy Family"

1979

First setlist (Leg 1)
 "Rockaway Beach"
"Teenage Lobotomy"
 "Blitzkrieg Bop"
"I Don't Want You"
"Go Mental"
"Gimme Gimme Shock Treatment"
 "Rock 'n' Roll High School"
 "I Wanna Be Sedated"
 "I Just Want to Have Something to Do"
"She's the One"
"I'm Against It"
 "Sheena Is a Punk Rocker"
"Havana Affair"
"Commando"
"Needles and Pins" (Jackie DeShannon cover)
"I Want You Around" or "I'm Affected"
"Surfin' Bird" (The Trashmen cover)
"Cretin Hop"
"Listen to My Heart"
"California Sun" (Joe Jones cover)
"I Don't Wanna Walk Around with You"
"Today Your Love, Tomorrow the World"
"Pinhead"
Encore:
 Do You Want to Dance" (Bobby Freeman cover)
 "Suzy Is a Headbanger"
 "Let's Dance" (Chris Montez cover)
Encore 2:
 "Judy Is a Punk"
"Now I Wanna Sniff Some Glue"
"We're a Happy Family"

Second setlist (Legs 2-3)
 "Blitzkrieg Bop"
"Teenage Lobotomy"
 "Rockaway Beach"
"I Don't Want You"
"Go Mental"
"Gimme Gimme Shock Treatment"
 "Rock 'n' Roll High School"
 "I Wanna Be Sedated"
 "I Just Want to Have Something to Do"
"Bad Brain" or "She's the One"
"I'm Against It"
 "Sheena Is a Punk Rocker"
"Havana Affair"
"Commando"
"Needles and Pins" (Jackie DeShannon cover)
"I Want You Around" or "I'm Affected"
"Surfin' Bird" (The Trashmen cover)
"Cretin Hop"
"All the Way"
"California Sun" (Joe Jones cover)
"I Don't Wanna Walk Around with You"
"Today Your Love, Tomorrow the World"
"Pinhead"
Encore:
 Do You Want to Dance" (Bobby Freeman cover)
 "Suzy Is a Headbanger"
 "Let's Dance" (Chris Montez cover)
Encore 2:
 "Chinese Rock"
"Beat on the Brat"
"We're a Happy Family"

1980

Typical setlist
 "Blitzkrieg Bop"
"Teenage Lobotomy"
 "Rockaway Beach"
 "I Can't Make It on Time" (Replaced "I Don't Want You after Leg 2)
 "Go Mental"
 "Gimme Gimme Shock Treatment"
 "Rock 'n' Roll High School"
 "I Wanna Be Sedated"
 "Do You Remember Rock 'n' Roll Radio?"
 "She's the One" or "Now I Wanna Sniff Some Glue"
 "I Just Want to Have Something to Do" or "I'm Against It"
 "Sheena Is a Punk Rocker"
 "Let's Go" or "This Ain't Havana"
 "Commando"
"Here Today, Gone Tomorrow" or "I Wanna Be Your Boyfriend"
 "I'm Affected"
 "Surfin' Bird" (The Trashmen cover)
 "Cretin Hop"
 "All the Way"
 "Judy Is a Punk"
 "California Sun" (Joe Jones cover)
 "I Don't Wanna Walk Around with You"
 "Today Your Love, Tomorrow the World"
 "Pinhead"

Encore:
 "Do You Want to Dance" (Bobby Freeman cover)
 "Suzy Is a Headbanger"
 "Let's Dance" (Chris Montez cover)

Encore 2:
 "Chinese Rock"
 "Beat on the Brat"
 "We're a Happy Family"

1981

First setlist (Legs 1-2)
 "Do You Remember Rock 'n' Roll Radio?"
"Do You Want to Dance" (Bobby Freeman cover)
 "Blitzkrieg Bop"
 "I Can't Make It on Time"
 "Go Mental"
 "Gimme Gimme Shock Treatment"
 "Rock 'n' Roll High School"
 "I Wanna Be Sedated"
 "Beat on the Brat"
"Now I Wanna Sniff Some Glue"
 "I Just Want to Have Something to Do"
 "Sheena Is a Punk Rocker"
 "You Sound Like You're Sick"
 "Commando"
"Here Today, Gone Tomorrow"
 "I'm Affected"
 "Rockaway Beach"
"Teenage Lobotomy"
 "Surfin' Bird" (The Trashmen cover)
 "Cretin Hop"
 "Oh Oh I Love Her So"
 "California Sun" (Joe Jones cover)
 "Today Your Love, Tomorrow the World"
 "Pinhead"

Encore:
 "Chinese Rock"
 "Suzy Is a Headbanger"
 "Let's Dance" (Chris Montez cover)

Encore 2:
 "The KKK Took My Baby Away"
 "I Don't Wanna Walk Around with You"
 "We're a Happy Family"

Second setlist (Legs 3-5)
 "Do You Remember Rock 'n' Roll Radio?"
 "Do You Want to Dance" (Bobby Freeman cover)
 "Blitzkrieg Bop"
 "This Business Is Killing Me"
 "All's Quiet on the Eastern Front"
 "Gimme Gimme Shock Treatment"
 "Rock 'n' Roll High School"
 "I Wanna Be Sedated"
 "Beat on the Brat"
 "The KKK Took My Baby Away"
 "Go Mental" or "Now I Wanna Sniff Some Glue"
 "You Sound Like You're Sick"
 "Suzy Is a Headbanger"
 "Let's Dance" (Chris Montez cover)
 "Here Today, Gone Tomorrow"
 "I'm Affected"
 "Chinese Rock"
 "Rockaway Beach"
 "Teenage Lobotomy"
 "Surfin' Bird" (The Trashmen cover)
 "Cretin Hop"
 "California Sun" (Joe Jones cover)
 "Today Your Love, Tomorrow the World"
 "Pinhead"

Encore:
 "Come on Now" or "She's a Sensation"
 "I Don't Wanna Walk Around with You"
 "Sheena Is a Punk Rocker"

Encore 2:
 "We Want the Airwaves"
"I Just Want to Have Something to Do"
 "We're a Happy Family"

1982

Typical setlist
 "Do You Remember Rock 'n' Roll Radio?"
 "Do You Want to Dance" (Bobby Freeman cover)
 "Blitzkrieg Bop"
 "This Business Is Killing Me"
 "All's Quiet on the Eastern Front"
 "Gimme Gimme Shock Treatment"
 "Rock 'n' Roll High School"
 "I Wanna Be Sedated"
 "Beat on the Brat"
 "The KKK Took My Baby Away"
 "Go Mental" or "Now I Wanna Sniff Some Glue"
 "You Sound Like You're Sick"
 "Suzy Is a Headbanger"
 "Let's Dance" (Chris Montez cover)
 "Here Today, Gone Tomorrow"
 "I'm Affected"
 "Chinese Rock"
 "Rockaway Beach"
 "Teenage Lobotomy"
 "Surfin' Bird" (The Trashmen cover)
 "Cretin Hop"
 "California Sun" (Joe Jones cover)
 "Today Your Love, Tomorrow the World"
 "Pinhead"

Encore:
 "Come on Now" or "She's a Sensation"
 "I Don't Wanna Walk Around with You"
 "Sheena Is a Punk Rocker"

Encore 2:
 "We Want the Airwaves"
"I Just Want to Have Something to Do"
 "We're a Happy Family"

1983

Typical setlist
 "Durango 95"
 "Teenage Lobotomy"
 "Psycho Therapy"
 "Blitzkrieg Bop"
 "Do You Remember Rock 'n' Roll Radio?"
 "All's Quiet on the Eastern Front"
 "Gimme Gimme Shock Treatment"
 "Rock 'n' Roll High School"
 "I Wanna Be Sedated"
 "Beat on the Brat"
 "The KKK Took My Baby Away"
 "Go Mental"
 "Outsider"
 "Suzy Is a Headbanger"
 "Let's Dance" (Chris Montez cover)
 "I'm Affected"
 "Little Bit O' Soul" (The Music Explosion cover)
 "Chinese Rock"
 "In the Park"
 "Rockaway Beach"
 "Surfin' Bird" (The Trashmen cover)
 "Cretin Hop"
 "California Sun" (Joe Jones cover)
 "Today Your Love, Tomorrow the World"
 "Pinhead"

Encore:
 "53rd & 3rd"
 "Highest Trails Above"
 "Sheena Is a Punk Rocker"

Encore 2:
 "Time Has Come Today" (The Chambers Brothers cover)
"I Just Want to Have Something to Do"
"We're a Happy Family"

1984

Typical setlist (Legs 2-5)
 "Durango 95"
 "Teenage Lobotomy"
 "Psycho Therapy"
 "Blitzkrieg Bop"
 "Do You Remember Rock 'n' Roll Radio?"
 "Danger Zone"
 "Gimme Gimme Shock Treatment"
 "Rock 'n' Roll High School"
 "I Wanna Be Sedated"
"Beat on the Brat"
"The KKK Took My Baby Away"
 "Go Mental"
 "I Don't Wanna Walk Around with You"
 "Suzy Is a Headbanger"
 "Let's Dance" (Chris Montez cover)
 "I'm Affected"
 "Too Tough to Die"
 "Chinese Rock"
 "Wart Hog"
 "Rockaway Beach"
 "Surfin' Bird" (The Trashmen cover)
 "Cretin Hop"
 "California Sun" (Joe Jones cover)
 "Today Your Love, Tomorrow the World"
 "Pinhead"

Encore:
 "Mama's Boy"
 "Highest Trails Above"
 "Sheena Is a Punk Rocker"

Encore 2:
 "Howling at the Moon (Sha-La-La)"
"Judy Is a Punk"
"We're a Happy Family"

1985

Typical setlist
 "Durango 95"
 "Teenage Lobotomy"
 "Psycho Therapy"
 "Blitzkrieg Bop"
 "Do You Remember Rock 'n' Roll Radio?"
 "Danger Zone"
 "Gimme Gimme Shock Treatment"
 "Rock 'n' Roll High School"
 "I Wanna Be Sedated"
 "Beat on the Brat"
 "The KKK Took My Baby Away"
 "Commando"
 "I Don't Wanna Walk Around with You" (Legs 1–2)"Judy Is a Punk" (Legs 3–7)Loudmouth" (Legs 8–9)
 "Suzy Is a Headbanger"
 "Let's Dance" (Chris Montez cover)
 "53rd & 3rd" (Replaced by "I Don't Care" after Leg 7)
 "Too Tough to Die"
 "Chinese Rock"
 "Wart Hog"
 "Rockaway Beach"
 "Surfin' Bird" (The Trashmen cover)
 "Cretin Hop"
 "California Sun" (Joe Jones cover)
 "Today Your Love, Tomorrow the World"
 "Pinhead"

Encore:
 "Mama's Boy"
 "Highest Trails Above"
 "Sheena Is a Punk Rocker"

Encore 2:
 "Chasing the Night" or "Howling at the Moon (Sha-La-La)" (Replaced by "Do You Want to Dance" after Leg 7)
 "I Don't Wanna Walk Around with You" (Replaced "I Don't Wanna Go Down to the Basement" after Leg 2)
 "We're a Happy Family"

1986

Typical setlist
 "Eat That Rat"
 "Teenage Lobotomy"
 "Psycho Therapy"
 "Blitzkrieg Bop"
 "Do You Remember Rock 'n' Roll Radio?"
 "Freak of Nature"
 "Gimme Gimme Shock Treatment"
 "Rock 'n' Roll High School"
 "I Wanna Be Sedated"
 "The KKK Took My Baby Away"
"Crummy Stuff"
 "Loudmouth"
 "Love Kills"
 "Sheena Is a Punk Rocker"
 "Glad to See You Go"
 "I Just Want to Have Something to Do"
 "Too Tough to Die"
 "Mama's Boy"
 "Animal Boy"
 "Wart Hog"
 "Surfin' Bird" (The Trashmen cover)
 "Cretin Hop"
 "I Don't Wanna Walk Around With You"
 "Today Your Love, Tomorrow the World"
 "Pinhead"

Encore:
  "Chinese Rock"
 "Somebody Put Something in My Drink"
 "Rockaway Beach"

Encore 2:
 "Do You Want to Dance" (Bobby Freeman cover)
 "California Sun" (Joe Jones cover)
 "We're a Happy Family"

1987

*With Clem Burke on drums

First setlist
 "Eat That Rat" or "Durango 95"
 "Teenage Lobotomy"
 "Psycho Therapy"
 "Blitzkrieg Bop"
 "Do You Remember Rock 'n' Roll Radio?"
 "Freak of Nature"
 "Gimme Gimme Shock Treatment"
 "Rock 'n' Roll High School"
 "I Wanna Be Sedated"
 "The KKK Took My Baby Away"
 "Crummy Stuff"
 "Loudmouth" or "Weasel Face" or "Bop Til' You Drop" or "Rockaway Beach"
 "Love Kills"
 "Sheena Is a Punk Rocker"
 "Glad to See You Go"
 "I Don't Care" (Replaced "I Just Want to Have Something to Do" after Leg 2)
 "Too Tough to Die"
 "Mama's Boy"
 "Animal Boy"
 "Wart Hog"
 "Surfin' Bird" (The Trashmen cover)
 "Cretin Hop"
 "I Don't Wanna Walk Around with You"
 "Today Your Love, Tomorrow the World"
 "Pinhead"

Encore:
  "Chinese Rock"
 "Somebody Put Something in My Drink"
 "Bonzo Goes to Bitburg" or "Rockaway Beach"

Encore 2:
 "Do You Want to Dance" (Bobby Freeman cover)
 "California Sun" (Joe Jones cover)
 "We're a Happy Family"

Second setlist
 "Durango 95"
 "Teenage Lobotomy"
 "Psycho Therapy"
 "Blitzkrieg Bop"
 "Do You Remember Rock 'n' Roll Radio?"
 "Bop Til' You Drop"
 "Gimme Gimme Shock Treatment"
 "Rock 'n' Roll High School"
 "I Wanna Be Sedated"
 "The KKK Took My Baby Away"
 "Chinese Rock"
 "Weasel Face"
 "Love Kills"
 "Sheena Is a Punk Rocker"
 "Rockaway Beach"
 "Garden of Serenity"
 "Too Tough to Die"
 "Mama's Boy"
 "Animal Boy"
 "Wart Hog"
 "Surfin' Bird" (The Trashmen cover)
 "Cretin Hop"
 "I Don't Wanna Walk Around with You"
 "Today Your Love, Tomorrow the World"
 "Pinhead"

Encore:
  "I Wanna Live"
 "Somebody Put Something in My Drink"
 "Bonzo Goes to Bitburg"

Encore 2:
 "Do You Want to Dance" (Bobby Freeman cover)
 "California Sun" (Joe Jones cover)
 "We're a Happy Family"

1988

Typical Setlist

 "Durango 95"
 "Teenage Lobotomy"
 "Psycho Therapy"
 "Blitzkrieg Bop"
 "Do You Remember Rock 'n' Roll Radio?"
 "Bop Til' You Drop"
 "Gimme Gimme Shock Treatment"
 "Rock 'n' Roll High School"
 "I Wanna Be Sedated"
 "I Don't Want You" or "Beat on the Brat"
 "Chinese Rock"
 "Weasel Face"
 "Commando"
 "Sheena Is a Punk Rocker"
 "Rockaway Beach"
 "Garden of Serenity" (Legs 1–7)"Needles and Pins" (Jackie DeShannon cover) (Legs 7–10) "Here Today, Gone Tomorrow" (Legs 11–12)
<li value="17"> "I Just Want to Have Something to Do"
 "Too Tough to Die"
 "Mama's Boy"
 "Animal Boy"
 "Wart Hog"
 "Surfin' Bird" (The Trashmen cover)
 "Cretin Hop"
 "I Don't Wanna Walk Around with You"
 "Today Your Love, Tomorrow the World"
 "Pinhead"

Encore:

<li value="27"> "I Wanna Live"
 "Somebody Put Something in My Drink"
 "Bonzo Goes to Bitburg"

Encore 2:

<li value=30"> "Do You Want to Dance" (Bobby Freeman cover)
 "California Sun" (Joe Jones cover) or "Let's Dance" (Chris Montez cover) or "Judy Is a Punk"
 "We're a Happy Family"

1989

First setlist (Legs 1-5)
 "Durango 95"
 "Teenage Lobotomy"
 "Psycho Therapy"
 "Blitzkrieg Bop"
 "Do You Remember Rock 'n' Roll Radio?"
 "Bop Til' You Drop"
 "Gimme Gimme Shock Treatment"
 "Rock 'n' Roll High School"
 "I Wanna Be Sedated"
 "I Just Want to Have Something to Do" or "Beat on the Brat"
 "Chinese Rock"
 "Bonzo Goes To Bitburg"
 "Go Mental"
 "Sheena Is a Punk Rocker"
 "Rockaway Beach"
 "Here Today, Gone Tomorrow"
 "Too Tough to Die" or "I Remember You"
 "She's the One"
 "Mama's Boy"
 "Animal Boy"
 "Wart Hog"
 "Surfin' Bird" (The Trashmen cover)
 "Cretin Hop"
 "I Don't Wanna Walk Around with You"
 "Today Your Love, Tomorrow the World"
 "Pinhead"

Encore:
 <li value="27">"I Wanna Live"
 "Somebody Put Something in My Drink"
 "Let's Dance" (Chris Montez cover)

Encore 2:
 <li value="30">"Do You Want to Dance" (Bobby Freeman cover)
 "Havana Affair"
 "We're a Happy Family"

Second setlist (Legs 6-10)
 "Durango 95"
 "Teenage Lobotomy"
 "Psycho Therapy"
 "Blitzkrieg Bop"
 "Do You Remember Rock 'n' Roll Radio?"
 "I Believe in Miracles"
 "Gimme Gimme Shock Treatment"
 "Rock 'n' Roll High School"
 "I Wanna Be Sedated"
 "Beat on the Brat"
 "I Wanna Live"
 "Bonzo Goes to Bitburg"
 "Go Mental"
 "Sheena Is a Punk Rocker"
 "Rockaway Beach"
 "Pet Sematary"
 "Don't Bust My Chops"
 "She's the One"
 "Mama's Boy"
 "Animal Boy"
 "Wart Hog"
 "Surfin' Bird" (The Trashmen cover)
 "Cretin Hop"
 "I Don't Wanna Walk Around with You"
 "Today Your Love, Tomorrow the World"
 "Pinhead"

Encore:
 <li value="27">"Chinese Rock"
 "Somebody Put Something in My Drink"
 "Let's Dance" (Chris Montez cover)

Encore 2:
 <li value="30">"Do You Want to Dance" (Bobby Freeman cover)
 "Palisades Park" (Freddy Cannon cover)
 "We're a Happy Family"

1990

First setlist (Legs 1-5)
 "Durango 95"
 "Teenage Lobotomy"
 "Psycho Therapy"
 "Blitzkrieg Bop"
 "Do You Remember Rock 'n' Roll Radio?"
 "I Believe in Miracles"
 "Gimme Gimme Shock Treatment"
 "Rock 'n' Roll High School"
 "I Wanna Be Sedated"
 "Beat on the Brat"
 "I Wanna Live"
 "Bonzo Goes to Bitburg"
 "Go Mental"
 "Sheena Is a Punk Rocker"
 "Rockaway Beach"
 "Pet Sematary"
 "Don't Bust My Chops"
 "She's the One"
 "Mama's Boy"
 "Animal Boy"
 "Wart Hog"
 "Surfin' Bird" (The Trashmen cover)
 "Cretin Hop"
 "I Don't Wanna Walk Around with You"
 "Today Your Love, Tomorrow the World"
 "Pinhead"

Encore:
 <li value="27"> "Chinese Rock"
 "Somebody Put Something in My Drink"
 "California Sun" (Joe Jones cover)

Encore 2:
 <li value="30">"Ignorance Is Bliss"
 "Judy Is a Punk"
 "We're a Happy Family"

Second setlist (Legs 6-9)
"Durango 95"
 "Teenage Lobotomy"
 "Psycho Therapy"
 "Blitzkrieg Bop"
 "Do You Remember Rock 'n' Roll Radio?"
 "I Believe in Miracles"
 "Gimme Gimme Shock Treatment"
 "Rock 'n' Roll High School"
 "I Wanna Be Sedated"
 "Beat on the Brat" (Replaced by "[[The KKK Took My Baby Away]]" on Leg 9)
 "I Wanna Live"
 "Bonzo Goes to Bitburg"
 "Commando"
 "Sheena Is a Punk Rocker"
 "Rockaway Beach"
 "Pet Sematary"
 "53rd & 3rd"
 "Now I Wanna Sniff Some Glue"
 "Mama's Boy"
 "Animal Boy"
 "Wart Hog"
 "Surfin' Bird" (The Trashmen cover)
 "Cretin Hop"
 "I Don't Wanna Walk Around with You"
 "Today Your Love, Tomorrow the World"
 "Pinhead"

Encore:
 <li value="27"> "Chinese Rock"
 "Somebody Put Something in My Drink"
 "We're a Happy Family"

Encore 2:
 <li value="30">"I Just Want to Have Something to Do"
 "California Sun" (Joe Jones cover)
 Judy Is a Punk"

1991

Typical setlist
 "Durango 95"
 "Teenage Lobotomy"
 "Psycho Therapy"
 "Blitzkrieg Bop"
 "Do You Remember Rock 'n' Roll Radio?"
 "I Believe in Miracles"
 "Gimme Gimme Shock Treatment"
 "Rock 'n' Roll High School"
 "I Wanna Be Sedated"
 "The KKK Took My Baby Away"
 "I Wanna Live"
 "Bonzo Goes to Bitburg"
 "Commando"
 "Sheena Is a Punk Rocker"
 "Rockaway Beach"
 "Pet Sematary"
 "53rd & 3rd" or "Too Tough to Die"
 "Glad to See You Go"
 "Mama's Boy"
 "Animal Boy"
 "Wart Hog"
 "Surfin' Bird" (The Trashmen cover)
 "Cretin Hop"
 "I Don't Wanna Walk Around with You"
 "Today Your Love, Tomorrow the World"
 "Pinhead"

Encore:
 <li value="27">"Chinese Rock"
 "Somebody Put Something in My Drink"
 "We're a Happy Family"

Encore 2:
 <li value="30">"Beat on the Brat"
 "California Sun" (Joe Jones cover) or "Judy Is a Punk"
 "Judy Is a Punk" or "California Sun" (Joe Jones cover)

1992

First setlist (Legs 1-5)
 "Durango 95"
 "Teenage Lobotomy"
 "Psycho Therapy"
 "Blitzkrieg Bop"
 "Do You Remember Rock 'n' Roll Radio?"
 "I Believe in Miracles"
 "Gimme Gimme Shock Treatment"
 "Rock 'n' Roll High School"
 "I Wanna Be Sedated"
 "Beat on the Brat"
 "I Wanna Live"
 "Bonzo Goes to Bitburg"
 "Commando"
 "Sheena Is a Punk Rocker"
 "Rockaway Beach"
 "Pet Sematary"
 "I Wanna Be Well"
 "Glad to See You Go"
 "Mama's Boy"
 "Animal Boy"
 "Wart Hog"
 "Surfin' Bird" (The Trashmen cover)
 "Cretin Hop"
 "I Don't Wanna Walk Around with You"
 "Today Your Love, Tomorrow the World"
 "Pinhead"

Encore:
 <li value="27">"Chinese Rock"
 "Somebody Put Something in My Drink"
 "We're a Happy Family"

Encore 2:
 <li value="30">"Strength to Endure"
 "I Just Want to Have Something to Do" or "Havana Affair"
 "Judy Is a Punk"

Second setlist (Legs 6-8)
 "Durango 95"
 "Teenage Lobotomy"
 "Psycho Therapy"
 "Blitzkrieg Bop"
 "Do You Remember Rock 'n' Roll Radio?"
 "I Believe in Miracles"
 "Gimme Gimme Shock Treatment"
 "Rock 'n' Roll High School"
 "I Wanna Be Sedated"
 "Censorshit"
 "I Wanna Live"
 "Bonzo Goes to Bitburg"
 "Tomorrow She Goes Away"
 "Sheena Is a Punk Rocker"
 "Rockaway Beach"
 "Pet Sematary"
 "I Wanna Be Well"
 "Glad to See You Go"
 "Take It as It Comes" (The Doors cover)
 "Somebody Put Something in My Drink"
 "Commando"
 "Wart Hog"
 "Cretin Hop"
 "Judy Is a Punk"
 "Today Your Love, Tomorrow the World"
 "Pinhead"

Encore:
 <li value="27">"Poison Heart"
 "Chinese Rock"
 "We're a Happy Family"

Encore 2:
 <li value="30">"Strength to Endure"
 "Beat on the Brat"
 "California Sun" (Joe Jones cover)

1993

First setlist
 "Durango 95"
 "Teenage Lobotomy"
 "Psycho Therapy"
 "Blitzkrieg Bop"
 "Do You Remember Rock 'n' Roll Radio?"
 "I Believe in Miracles"
 "Gimme Gimme Shock Treatment"
 "Rock 'n' Roll High School"
 "I Wanna Be Sedated"
"Censorshit"
 "I Wanna Live"
 "Bonzo Goes to Bitburg"
 "Tomorrow She Goes Away"
 "Sheena Is a Punk Rocker"
 "Rockaway Beach"
 "Pet Sematary"
 "I Wanna Be Well"
 "Glad to See You Go"
 "Take It as It Comes" (The Doors cover)
 "Somebody Put Something in My Drink"
 "Commando"
 "Wart Hog"
 "Cretin Hop"
 "Judy Is a Punk"
 "Today Your Love, Tomorrow the World"
 "Pinhead"

Encore:
 <li value="27"> "Poison Heart"
 "Chinese Rock" or "7 and 7 Is" (Love cover)
 "We're a Happy Family"

Encore 2:
 <li value="30">"Strength to Endure"
 "Beat on the Brat"
 "California Sun" (Joe Jones cover) <small>Replaced by "Havana Affair" on Leg 5)

Second setlist
 "Durango 95"
 "Teenage Lobotomy"
 "Psycho Therapy"
 "Blitzkrieg Bop"
 "Do You Remember Rock 'n' Roll Radio?"
 "I Believe in Miracles"
 "Gimme Gimme Shock Treatment"
 "Rock 'n' Roll High School"
 "I Wanna Be Sedated"
 "Censorshit"
 "I Wanna Live"
 "Bonzo Goes to Bitburg"
 "Tomorrow She Goes Away"
 "Sheena Is a Punk Rocker"
 "Rockaway Beach"
 "Pet Sematary"
 "I Wanna Be Well"
 "Glad to See You Go"
 "Take It as It Comes" (The Doors cover)
 "Somebody Put Something in My Drink"
 "7 and 7 Is" (Love cover)
 "Wart Hog"
 "Cretin Hop"
 "Judy Is a Punk"
 "Today Your Love, Tomorrow the World"
 "Pinhead"

Encore:
 <li value="27"> "My Back Pages" (Bob Dylan cover)
 "Poison Heart"
 "We're a Happy Family"

Encore 2:
 <li value="30">"Strength to Endure"
 "Chinese Rock"
 "Beat on the Brat"

1994

* - D Generation were supposed to open for this show but cancelled.

Typical setlist
 "Durango 95"
 "Teenage Lobotomy"
 "Psycho Therapy"
 "Blitzkrieg Bop"
 "Do You Remember Rock 'n' Roll Radio?"
 "I Believe in Miracles"
 "Gimme Gimme Shock Treatment"
 "Rock 'n' Roll High School"
 "I Wanna Be Sedated"
 "Substitute" (The Who cover) (Replaced by "[[Have You Ever Seen the Rain?]]" after Leg 2)
 "I Wanna Live"
 "Bonzo Goes to Bitburg"
 "Commando"
 "Sheena Is a Punk Rocker"
 "Rockaway Beach"
 "Pet Sematary"
 "Strength to Endure" or "Main Man"
 "Journey to the Center of the Mind" (The Amboy Dukes cover)
 "Take It as It Comes" (The Doors cover)
 "Somebody Put Something in My Drink"
 "7 and 7 Is" (Love cover)
 "Wart Hog"
 "Cretin Hop"
 "Listen to My Heart"
 "Today Your Love, Tomorrow the World"
 "Pinhead"

Encore:
 <li value="27">"My Back Pages" (Bob Dylan cover)
 "Poison Heart"
 "We're a Happy Family"

Encore 2:
 <li value="30">"The Shape of Things to Come" (Max Frost and the Troopers cover) or "R.A.M.O.N.E.S." (Motörhead cover)
 "Chinese Rock"
 "Beat on the Brat"

1995

First setlist (Leg 1-2)
 "Durango 95"
 "Teenage Lobotomy"
 "Psycho Therapy"
 "Blitzkrieg Bop"
 "Do You Remember Rock 'n' Roll Radio?"
 "I Believe in Miracles"
 "Gimme Gimme Shock Treatment"
 "Rock 'n' Roll High School"
 "I Wanna Be Sedated"
 "Have You Ever Seen the Rain?" (Creedence Clearwater Revival cover)
 "I Wanna Live" (Replaced by "[[The KKK Took My Baby Away]]" after Leg 1)
 "Bonzo Goes to Bitburg" (Replaced by "I Don't Wanna Grow Up"after Leg 1)
 "Commando"
 "Sheena Is a Punk Rocker"
 "Rockaway Beach"
 "Pet Sematary"
 "Strength to Endure"
 "Cretin Family"
 "Take It as It Comes" (The Doors cover)
 "Somebody Put Something in My Drink"
 "7 and 7 Is" (Love cover)
 "Wart Hog"
 "Cretin Hop"
 "Listen to My Heart"
 "Today Your Love, Tomorrow the World"
 "Pinhead"

Encore:
 <li value="27"> "My Back Pages" (Bob Dylan cover)
 "Poison Heart"
 "We're a Happy Family"

Encore 2:
 <li value="30">"R.A.M.O.N.E.S." (Motörhead cover)
 "Chinese Rock"
 "Beat on the Brat"

Second setlist (Legs 4-7)
 "Durango 95"
 "Teenage Lobotomy"
 "Psycho Therapy"
 "Blitzkrieg Bop"
 "Do You Remember Rock 'n' Roll Radio?"
 "I Believe in Miracles"
 "Gimme Gimme Shock Treatment"
 "Rock 'n' Roll High School"
 "I Wanna Be Sedated"
 "Spider-Man"
 "The KKK Took My Baby Away"
 "I Don't Wanna Grow Up" (Tom Waits cover)
 "Commando"
 "Sheena Is a Punk Rocker"
 "Rockaway Beach"
 "Pet Sematary"
 "Strength to Endure"
 "Cretin Family"
 "Take It as It Comes" (The Doors cover)
 "Somebody Put Something in My Drink"
 "7 and 7 Is" (Love cover)
 "Wart Hog"
 "Cretin Hop"
 "R.A.M.O.N.E.S." (Motörhead cover)
 "Today Your Love, Tomorrow the World"
 "Pinhead"

Encore:
 <li value="27">"The Crusher"
 "Poison Heart"
 "We're a Happy Family"

Encore 2:
 <li value="30">"My Back Pages" (Bob Dylan cover)
 "Chinese Rock"
 "Beat on the Brat"

Supporting act setlist 

 "Durango 95"
 "Teenage Lobotomy"
 "Psycho Therapy"
 "Blitzkrieg Bop"
 "Do You Remember Rock 'n' Roll Radio?"
 "I Believe in Miracles"
 "Gimme Gimme Shock Treatment"
 "Rock 'n' Roll High School"
 "I Wanna Be Sedated"
 "Spider-Man" or "I Don't Wanna Grow Up" (Tom Waits cover)
 "Sheena Is a Punk Rocker"
 "Rockaway Beach"
 "Pet Sematary"
 "The Crusher"
 "Cretin Family" or "My Back Pages" (Bob Dylan cover)
 "Chinese Rock"
 "Somebody Put Something in My Drink"
 "Wart Hog"
 "Cretin Hop"
 "R.A.M.O.N.E.S." (Motörhead cover)
 "Today Your Love, Tomorrow the World"
 "Pinhead"

1996

Typical Main Setlist
 "Durango 95"
 "Teenage Lobotomy"
 "Psycho Therapy"
 "Blitzkrieg Bop"
 "Do You Remember Rock 'n' Roll Radio?"
 "I Believe in Miracles"
 "Gimme Gimme Shock Treatment"
 "Rock 'n' Roll High School"
 "I Wanna Be Sedated"
 "Spider-Man"
 "The KKK Took My Baby Away"
 "I Don't Wanna Grow Up" (Tom Waits cover)
 "Commando" (Replaced by "[[Have You Ever Seen the Rain?]]" for Leg 3
 "Sheena Is a Punk Rocker"
 "Rockaway Beach"
 "Pet Sematary"
 "Strength to Endure"
 "Cretin Family"
 "Do You Want to Dance" (Bobby Freeman cover)
 "Somebody Put Something in My Drink"
"7 and 7 Is" (Love cover) (Leg 1)"California Sun" (Joe Jones cover) (Leg 2)"Havana Affair" (Leg 3)"I Just Want to Have Something to Do" (Legs 4–5)
 <li value="22">"Wart Hog"
 "Cretin Hop"
"R.A.M.O.N.E.S." (Motörhead cover)
 "Today Your Love, Tomorrow the World"
 "Pinhead"

Encore:
 <li value="27">"The Crusher"
"Poison Heart" or (Replaced by "I Don't Want You") after Leg 3)
 "We're a Happy Family"(Replaced by "[[Surfin' Bird]]" cover) for Leg 3)

Encore 2:
 "[[My Back Pages]]" ([[Bob Dylan]] cover)
 "[[Chinese Rock]]"
 "[[Beat on the Brat]]"
{{col-2}}

Lollapalooza setlist
 "[[Durango 95 (song)|Durango 95]]"
 "[[Teenage Lobotomy]]"
 "Psycho Therapy"
 "[[Blitzkrieg Bop]]"
 "[[Do You Remember Rock 'n' Roll Radio?]]"
 "I Believe in Miracles"
 "Gimme Gimme Shock Treatment"
 "[[Rock 'n' Roll High School (song)|Rock 'n' Roll High School]]"
 "[[I Wanna Be Sedated]]"
 "[[Spider-Man (theme song)|Spider-Man]]"
 "[[Sheena Is a Punk Rocker]]"
 "[[Rockaway Beach (song)|Rockaway Beach]]"
 "[[Pet Sematary (song)|Pet Sematary]]"
 "[[Beat on the Brat]]" or "[[Do You Want to Dance]]" ([[Bobby Freeman]] cover)
 "[[53rd & 3rd]]"
 "[[Chinese Rock]]"
 "Wart Hog"
 "Cretin Hop"
 "[[R.A.M.O.N.E.S.]]" ([[Motörhead]] cover)
 "Today Your Love, Tomorrow the World"
 "Pinhead"
{{col-end}}

References
{{reflist}}

Bibliography
{{Cite book |last1=Melnick |first1=Monte |last2=Meyer |first2=Frank |title=On The Road With The Ramones |publisher=[[Wise Music Group|Music Sales]] |year=2019 |orig-year=2003 |isbn=978-0-857-12223-0}}
{{Cite book |last1=Ramone |first1=Johnny |title=[[Commando (book)|Commando]] |publisher=[[Abrams Books]] |year=2012 |isbn=978-0-810-99660-1}}

{{Ramones}}

{{DEFAULTSORT:Ramones concerts, List of}}
[[Category:Ramones|Concerts]]
[[Category:Lists of concert tours]]